Osterau may refer to

 Osterau (Bramau), a tributary of the Bramau in Schleswig-Holstein, Germany
 Osterau (Broklandsau), a tributary of the Broklandsau in Schleswig-Holstein, Germany

See also
Østerå (disambiguation)